The 2017–18 Bobsleigh World Cup was a multi-race series over a season for bobsleigh. The season started on 9 November 2017 in Lake Placid, USA and ended on 21 January 2018 in Königssee, Germany. The World Cup is organised by the IBSF (formerly the FIBT) who also run World Cups and Championships in skeleton. The season was sponsored by BMW.

Calendar
Below is the schedule of the 2017/18 season.

Results

Two-man

Four-man

Two-woman

Standings

Two-man

Four-man

Two-woman

Medal table

References

External links 
 IBSF

Bobsleigh World Cup
2017 in bobsleigh
2018 in bobsleigh